Bernier is a French surname. Notable people with the surname include:

 Chantal Bernier, Canadian lawyer 
 Charles A. Bernier (1890–1963), American college sports coach
 David Bernier or Kike Bernier, Puerto Rican fencer
 Étienne-Alexandre Bernier (1762 – 1806), French religious figure and politician
 François Bernier (1620 – 1688), Mughal physician and traveller
 Frédérique Bernier, French Canadian writer and academic
 Géo Bernier (1862 – 1918), Belgian painter
 Georges Bernier, French humorist
 Gilles Bernier (disambiguation), several people
 Gilles Bernier (Quebec politician) (born 1934), MP for Beauce, 1984–1997
 Gilles Bernier (New Brunswick politician) (born 1955) MP for Tobique—Mactaquac, 1997–2000
 Guylaine Bernier (b. 1948), Canadian rower and sports leader
 Joachim Bernier de La Brousse (1580 – 1623), French poet 
 Jonathan Bernier, Canadian ice hockey player
 Joseph Bernier (b. 1874), Canadian politician
 Joseph-Elzéar Bernier (b. 1852), Canadian mariner
 Leo Bernier (b. 1929), Canadian politician
 Maxime Bernier (b. 1963), Canadian politician and cabinet minister 

 Nicolas Bernier, French composer
 Patrice Bernier, Canadian soccer player
 Paul Bernier (1906–1964), Canadian archbishop, Vatican diplomat
 René Bernier (1901 – 1984), Belgian composer
 Steve Bernier, Canadian ice hockey player
 Sylvie Bernier, Canadian Olympic athlete

See also
 Bernier's teal (Anas bernieri), a bird
 Bernier River

French-language surnames